The 1974 United States Senate election in Pennsylvania was held on November 5, 1974. Incumbent Republican U.S. Senator Richard Schweiker was re-elected to a second term over Democratic mayor of Pittsburgh Peter F. Flaherty.

Democratic primary

Candidates
Herb Denenberg, Pennsylvania Insurance Commissioner
Pete Flaherty, Mayor of Pittsburgh
Frank Mesaros
James M. Quigley, former U.S. Representative from Camp Hill

General election

Candidates
Pete Flaherty, Mayor of Pittsburgh (Democratic)
Richard Schweiker, incumbent U.S. Senator (Republican)
George W. Shankey (Constitution)

Campaign
In the general election campaign, Schweiker faced popular Pittsburgh mayor Peter Flaherty. Both candidates, as highlighted by a New York Times article, "[took] firm stands against inflation, recession, big spending by the Federal Government and abortion on demand." Schweiker, who was endorsed by the AFL–CIO, distanced himself from the Richard Nixon administration, specifically the Watergate scandal, by emphasizing his early calls for Nixon's resignation and the fact that he was on Nixon's "enemies list."

In the end, Schweiker won re-election with 53% of the popular vote, with Flaherty winning 45.9%. Schweiker carried 53 of Pennsylvania's counties, a decrease from the 59 counties he carried in the 1968 election. Flaherty had a strong showing in Allegheny County, which contains his home town of Pittsburgh, which Schweiker had won in 1968. The final election results represented a political divide between the eastern and western portions of the state, Schweiker in the east and Flaherty in the west, with the exception of Flaherty's slim 4,491 vote victory in Philadelphia.

Results

See also 
 United States Senate elections, 1974 and 1975

References

Pennsylvania
1974
1974 Pennsylvania elections